Jaqueline Sanchez Galloway (born December 27, 1995) is an American taekwondo competitor and a bronze medalist in the 2016 Olympics.  She is also a citizen of Mexico.

2012 season
Galloway was an alternate for the Mexican team at the 2012 Olympics.

2015 season
She won bronze at the 2015 World Taekwondo Championships.  Galloway earned a spot in the 2016 Olympics by being in the top six ranked competitors in her weight class.

Personal life
She is an engineering student at Southern Methodist University.  While there she was on the rowing team.

References

External links
 Team USA Biography

1995 births
Living people
American female taekwondo practitioners
American sportspeople of Mexican descent
Taekwondo practitioners at the 2016 Summer Olympics
Olympic bronze medalists for the United States in taekwondo
Medalists at the 2016 Summer Olympics
Southern Methodist University alumni
Mexican female taekwondo practitioners
Mexican sportswomen
Olympic taekwondo practitioners of Mexico
Taekwondo practitioners at the 2012 Summer Olympics
Pan American Games medalists in taekwondo
Pan American Games gold medalists for the United States
Taekwondo practitioners at the 2015 Pan American Games
World Taekwondo Championships medalists
Medalists at the 2015 Pan American Games
21st-century American women